Bucculatrix eurotiella is a species of moth in the family Bucculatricidae. It is found in North America, where it has been recorded from California, Utah and British Columbia. It was described by Thomas de Grey, 6th Baron Walsingham in 1907.

The wingspan is 8–10 mm. The forewings are white, marked with patches of ocherous and brown-tipped ocherous scales. The hindwings are pale brownish grey. Adults have been recorded on wing in May.

The larvae feed on Chrysothamnus and Senecio species.

References

Natural History Museum Lepidoptera generic names catalog

Bucculatricidae
Moths described in 1907
Taxa named by Thomas de Grey, 6th Baron Walsingham
Moths of North America